Joseph or Joe Hardy may refer to:

 Joseph Hardy (director) (born 1929), American director and performer
 Joe Hardy (politician) (born 1949), Nevada Republican
 Joseph A. Hardy III (1923–2023), American entrepreneur; founder and CEO of 84 Lumber 
 Jocelyn Hardy (1945–2021), known as Joe, Canadian ice hockey player
 Joe Hardy (footballer) (born 1998), English footballer
 Joe Hardy (The Hardy Boys), fictional character in The Hardy Boys novel series

 Joe Hardy, a character in the musical Damn Yankees